The Ethnological Treasure of Kosovo is an ethnographic museum in Pristina, Kosovo.  It is located in Emin Gjiku Complex, a monument of culture from the 18th century. This house was once owned by the family of Emin Gjikolli. Emin Gjikolli nickname means "little man", in Turkish "Eminçik", which the complex holds the name today. In the museum, tools and items related to lifestyle from the Ottoman Kosovo period are on display.

In 2002, the Ethnological Museum opened its exhibition of a permanent nature, in which ancient clothing, tools, containers furniture and old weapons, etc., were presented.

Until 1990, the Emin Gjiku Complex served as a nature museum and after the completion of internationally funded conservation works in 2003, it was turned into an ethnological museum housing a vast collection of traditional costumes as well as utensils, handcraft elements and other tools used in everyday life. The above-mentioned collection is sheltered in the two central buildings of the complex (the house and the guest house) situated at the inner court, while at the entrance court, the relocated building is rented under a special contract by the museum to a Contemporary Art Centre 'Stacion' and the stable, the object of this study is left unused to date, even though the constant promises by the director of the museum to turn it into a traditional food restaurant.

Pottery

Pottery was an early art  practice in daily ancient Albanian Illyrian life. Archaeological history findings tell that this production of these goods for practical life service dates back to antiquity and this type of production made of clay lives together with the human being even today, although now only as decorative means.
-Productions of pottery amongst ancient Illyrian found their usage in daily life basis. They were made in shapes of dishes for storage of food and drinks. It was a known art in Albanian ethnic area, this type of craftsmanship has been taught in generations, because the baked clay was used for producing a series of objects on preservation and cultivation of foods. The clay was also used of producing at all times dishes of different types, shapes and sizes adequate for the practical needs in service people. These pots were known as pitos, drinks, cereals and other foods were preserved. The small types of dishes served in the daily practice for keeping fluid and except this other types of dishes and objects were produced serving for cult and decoration purposes. From the physiognomy and morphology of production, it must have been a craftsmanship almost professional with exception of producing tools for baking bread, known as çerep. Dishes and furniture from pottery have found their usage extensively in our people, in the village and city as well. This type of craftsmanship had been practiced a lot until around the 1970s.
Pottery products now may be encountered only as illustration of passed era and just for curiosity and decoration. Now we may encounter rare masters of pottery, and be counted three or four.

Wood treasures 

Our people are considered as one of the oldest peoples in the region of Balkans, and maybe even in the continent possessing quite a rich traditions, touching deeply in history regarding use of wood in practical life. Products made of wood in our people are of diverse types. In this aspect, we may assert that wood made products are mainly outlined from the complexity of working tools, furniture, decorations, household equipment for daily use. Almost from the earliest times, for wood products there are two types of craftsmen to be distinguished; the folk ones and the professional craftsmen. Both these categories of craftsmen used to produce in their from and manner, but we may state that the folk craftsman was more widely spread and would produce own products mainly for home use, whereas the professional craftsman usually would put his products into market; and that implies that it had the universal concept, more advanced and involving an artistic charm of his products. It is important to mention that a considerable contingent of products of tools of wood contain in themselves a great ornamental wealth which undoubtedly empresses peoples beliefs which deeply originate from the history, since paganism, and such expressions have resisted centuries and whose elements although in minimal figures nowadays, their traces are encountered and coexist in one form or another with our people

Demotic linen and textiles

The history of textile among us and their production according to some study sources date back since antiquity. As for illustration we can mention the Fustanella (kit) and Xhubleta, as wearing of women, which are considered to illustrate by example their life duration. Linen and textile among Albanians are handmade and Vek made products which in the past were very widely spread. They are so widely spread that each home and family have produced such as linen as well as textile in their house environments with classical means, first of all made of sheep and goat wool, and made of other materials like linen, cotton, etc. like very craftsmanship, this type of production of linen and fabric has the complexity of work in production. Like traditionally our people has had the fixed idea of wearing beautifully, orderly and tastefully, and they preserve as a very precious treasure even nowadays. In linen and in textile as well, we not only encounter brilliant techniques of physical production, but also the art which is expressed through ornamental and artistic figures. Within the ornamental aspect there are figures outlined which are directly related with people's beliefs, which reflects the spirit of the people, since the earliest times of paganism through periods until today.
Craftsmanship of production of linen and textile further in the pas hasn't been widely spread only in the urban or rural areas, but in both areas. Although the reality says so, the traditional treasures of linen and textile, classical production from vek, thanking the interest and consequences of devoted people of ethno culture in the sciences of museum, there traces even physically are preserved in the Museum of Kosovo, through what ethno-cultural values of tradition regarding linen and wearing are reflected through physical objects.

Weapons

Albanian people, as one of the most antique peoples of Balkans, inherited from the past a rich material culture. When speaking of weapons, it must be mentioned that the Albanian never went away from his weapons. The weapon accompanied him in all his lifetime. In every case in any risk he has relied on it. The Albanian lets himself be killed but never surrenders his weapon. The gun has equal importance with honor of his home, with the honor of his wife and his children, to always be ready in reaction of any war cry against invaders, each individual and every family was obliged to ensure a weapon, to any man from 13 to 15 years old. The weapons made in Kosovo, especially in Prizren, Peja and Gjakova were of high quality and they were sold in the whole Ottoman Empire, even outside the Empire, like in Egypt, Little Asia, Persia, India, etc. The shops were weapons were produced in majority of cases were located in certain roads or in centuries of the cities. According to the data from 1866, in Prizren there were 208 weapon workshops, 53 were even specialized in production of barrels of the weapon and circuits of the pistols and 155 shops were doing the decoration of weapons with golden and silver applications. Production of weapons was made in processes. The process of producing barrels (drilling with "metkap" and long "kalizvar"), the process of making circuits, making belts by leather workers, tempering and testing shots, assembling and finally the process of decorating of the boxes by the silversmiths. The weapons ere decorated with different types of motifs. Every trade centre had its own profile and special technique of weapon decoration. Techniques of weapon decoration were of diverse natures such as: decoration with filigree, with "Savat", with silver work. (The text written for permanent exhibition in the complex Emin Gjiku, from the author Bashkim Lajçi).

Body jewellery

Body jewellery as a specific type of our ethno-culture, in a particular manner depict the folk arts of this nature and they have been extended broadly as artistic  productions amongst us. Thus the values under possession of the institution (Museum) and 230 exhibits of this treasure which have been shown by the fund of the Museum of Kosovo as selected, and they were sent to Belgrade for temporary exhibition in 1998, which are of complex, unique, artistic profile, with multi-dimensional values at the same time they illustrate in complex manner the layered historical nature of this segment of material and spiritual ethno-culture of the people by also involving the artistic and artisanal character, which has been built in special manner amongst our people. These  treasures contain in themselves also qualitative specifics because they are accompanied by elements which have played a non-portrait role; a component which has been preserved as an element of spiritual culture since pre-history until today in all our ethnic background.
Treasure of body jewelleries in the aspect of construction of motifs are made simply with classical tools but through which their complex meaning diversity is shown, and the harmonized arrangement of ornamentals is a perfect shape in the objects belonging different ages, and through which that present motifs where people's beliefs of the tradition are involved, the youth love, family love, love for the successors, the love for spouse and national symbols, symbols people's faith related to cult and other accessory elements intermingled in them.

Musical instruments

Since existence of mankind, the beauty of artistic creation as well, where except the basic life needs, the human being also feels the need of amusement. Initially the musical instruments ere casual products, afterwards they took their practical function. The human spirit loves dancing, songs, melodies of folk instruments which were inherited through generations for centuries, in order to find thee delight, joy and relaxation from the daily life matters. Amusement from instruments of folk art has been a school of noble and patriotic education of the people. It was at the same time a preserver and developer of cultural heritage of the people in centuries, it has been an archive of folk memory of history of the pas generations. Although, not a highly educated people, it had its poets, prose, writers, humor artists, orators and its bright actors, although a part of them remained anonymous; it had the generous composers and dancers. The folklore art of the word, sounds of rhythms and dancing and musical instruments has been a powerful force of cohesion, amongst some other essential occurrences, which held this collectiveness as united, preserving it not to disintegrated and absorbed by cultures of other cultures or invading peoples The folk genius not only has he created and interpreted musical works, but he has also produced and still continues to produce them. In the case  we would mention that musical instruments like lute makes a long life amongst us and it is undoubtedly considered as one of the oldest in the Balkan Peninsula, but it belongs to the Albanian people, and it has been produced and invented for the first time by this people. According to the discoveries from archaeological digging, an interesting musical instrument has also been found, which is called Ocarina, and which dates back from the era of early neolith which was found in Runik village of the municipality of Skenderaj.

See also
Pristina
Kosovo Museum
Tourism in Kosovo
History of Kosovo
Albanians

Notes

References

External links

2003 establishments in Kosovo
Museums in Pristina
Cultural heritage of Kosovo